In Intelligent Network and CAMEL switching, a BCSM is a Basic Call State Model.

Types
 O-BCSM (Originating BCSM)
 T-BCSM (Terminating BCSM)
A fundamental concept for IN control is the basic call state model (BCSM). When a call is processed
by an exchange, the call goes through a number of pre-defined phases. These phases of the call are
described in the BCSM. The BCSM generally follows the ISUP signalling of a call

State machine description
In the following IN BCSMs, bold Detection Points and Points In Call are also present in the CAMEL Ph1 subset. 

TODO: Expand to Ph2,3,4

O-BCSM

Points in call
1. O_Null & Authorize Origination Attempt
2. Collected_info (Merged with 1. in CAMEL Ph1)
3. Analyze_Info
4. Routing & Alerting (Merged with 3. in CAMEL Ph1)
5. O_Active
6. O_Exception

Detection Points
1 Origination_Attempt_Authorized
2 Collected_Info
3 Analyzed_Info (this is the only Statically armed DP, others are dynamically armed using "Request Report BCSM (RRBE)" message by the SCP)
4 Route_Select_Failure
5 O_Called_Party_Busy
6 O_No_Answer
7 O_Answer
8 O_Mid_Call
9 O_Disconnect
10 O_Abandon

T-BCSM

Points in call
7. T_Null & Authorize Termination_Attempt
8. Select_Facility & Present_Call
9. T_Alerting (Merged with 8. in CAMEL Ph1)
10. T_Active
11. T_Exception

Detection Points
12 Termination_Attempt_Authorized
13 T_Called_Party_Busy
14 T_No_Answer
15 T_Answer
16 T_Mid_Call
17 T_Disconnect
18 T_Abandon

Messages

 Initial Detection Point (IDP)
 RRBE (Request Report BCSM)
 Event Report BCSM (ERB)
 Connect (CON)
 Continue (CUE)
 Send Charging Information (SCI)
 ACH (Apply Charging)
 ACR (Apply Charging Report)

References

Signaling System 7
GSM standard